The ZVI Falcon is a Czech 12.7 mm caliber bolt-action bullpup anti-materiel rifle developed by Zbrojovka Vsetín Inc. (now ZVI Inc.).

Design and features
The Falcon is a bullpup bolt-action rifle with a Mauser locking system and fixed 2-round box magazine. It features a magazine cut-off, necessitating a new cartridge must be manually loaded into the chamber after each shot when it is engaged. The bolt has two locking lugs.

Mounted about halfway along the Falcon are a collapsible bipod and a carrying handle. It also features a muzzle brake to dampen recoil; ZVI states that the muzzle brake reduces recoil by 75 percent. A bayonet mount was planned, but was not included on production versions.

The Falcon features a sight rail to mount the Meopta ZD 10×50 telescopic sight for daylight engagements and the Meopta ZN 6× passive night vision sight for nighttime use. A protective cover is available to protect the scope from damage. The rifle also has backup iron sights for emergency use if the scope is damaged.

The Falcon can be stowed in a carrying case for transport, and a special backpack is available for use by airborne forces.

Conflicts
The Falcon was used in the War in Afghanistan . It is also used by Armed Forces of Ukraine during 2022 Russian invasion of Ukraine.

Users
 
 
 
 
  19 gifted from Czech Republic, sent as part of a military package in response to the 2022 Russian invasion of Ukraine.

See also
List of bullpup firearms
List of sniper rifles

References

.50 BMG sniper rifles
12.7×108 mm sniper rifles
Bolt-action rifles
Anti-materiel rifles
Bullpup rifles